Keelstone Branch is a stream in Lincoln County in the U.S. state of Missouri.

Keelstone Branch was named for deposits of red chalk ("keel" in local parlance) near its course.

See also
List of rivers of Missouri

References

Rivers of Lincoln County, Missouri
Rivers of Missouri